Thomas Goldsmith (died 1714) was a privateer from Dartmouth during the War of Spanish Succession. After serving as a privateer around 1710, he turned to piracy aboard his ship Snap Dragon and accumulated great wealth.

He is chiefly remembered not for his piracy but for retiring and dying peacefully in his bed, to be buried in his hometown churchyard in 1714. His gravestone inscription is:

See also
Queen Anne's War - name for the North American theater of the War of the Spanish Succession.

References

Year of birth missing
1714 deaths
18th-century pirates
British pirates
English privateers
People from Dartmouth, Devon